Kiryandongo General Hospital, is a hospital in the Western Region of Uganda.

Location

The coordinates of Kiryandongo General Hospital are 01°52'46.0"N, 32°03'43.0"E (Latitude:1.879439; Longitude:32.061950).

Overview
Kiryandongo General Hospital is a 109-bed, government-owned hospital. It serves Kiryandongo District and parts of the districts of Masindi, Nakasongola, Oyam, Apac, Amuru, and  Nwoya. 

Beginning in December 2013, the government of Uganda, using a loan from the World Bank, began renovating this hospital at a cost of US$5,654,229. The renovations included the following: 1. New and bigger Outpatients Department 2. A new Emergency Room (Casualty Department) 3. Laundry facilities for family members of patients 4. Kitchen facilities for family members of patients 5. A new incinerator 6. Disposal facilities for placentas and other biohazard waste 7. Twelve new staff houses 8. Replacement of broken glass in windows and doors; both inside and outside 9. Internal and external painting 10. Replace old 50kVA transformer with new 500kVA unit 11. Upgrade the water supply including a new  reservoir 12. Dig a borehole powered with a solar water pump 13. Upgrade and repair internal and external plumbing.

See also
List of hospitals in Uganda

References

External links
 Website of Uganda Ministry of Health
 In pictures: Kiryandongo hospital gets facelift

Hospitals in Uganda
Kiryandongo District
Bunyoro sub-region
Western Region, Uganda
1974 establishments in Uganda
Hospital buildings completed in 1974